The 1928–29 Yorkshire Cup was the 21st occasion on which the Yorkshire Cup competition had been held. Leeds won the trophy by beating Featherstone Rovers in the final by the score of 5-0. The match was played at Belle Vue, in the City of Wakefield, now in West Yorkshire. The attendance was 14,000 and receipts were £838.  This was Leeds' first of six victories in a period of ten years, during which time they won every Yorkshire Cup final in which they appeared.

Background 
The Rugby Football League's Yorkshire Cup competition was a knock-out competition between (mainly professional) rugby league clubs from  the  county of Yorkshire. The actual area was at times increased to encompass other teams from  outside the  county such as Newcastle, Mansfield, Coventry, and even London (in the form of Acton & Willesden. The Rugby League season always (until the onset of "Summer Rugby" in 1996) ran from around August-time through to around May-time and this competition always took place early in the season, in the Autumn, with the final taking place in (or just before) December (The only exception to this was when disruption of the fixture list was caused during, and immediately after, the two World Wars).

Competition and results  
This season there were no junior/amateur clubs taking part, no new entrants and no "leavers" and so the total of entries remained the  same at fifteen. This in turn resulted in three byes in the first round.

Round 1 
Involved  7 matches (with one bye) and 15 clubs

Round 1 - replays  
Involved  1 match and 2 clubs

Round 2 – quarterfinals 
Involved 4 matches and 8 clubs

Round 3 – semifinals  
Involved 2 matches and 4 clubs

Final

Teams and scorers 

Scoring - Try = four points - Goal = two points - Drop goal = one point

The road to success 
The  following chart excludes any preliminary round fixtures/results

Notes 
1 * The attendance is given as 13,000 by RUGBYLEAGUEproject  but 14,000 by the  Rothmans Rugby League Yearbook of 1991-92 and 1990-91

2 * Belle Vue is the home ground of Wakefield Trinity with a capacity of approximately 12,500. The record attendance was 37,906 on the 21 March 1936 in the Challenge Cup semi-final between Leeds and Huddersfield

See also 
1928–29 Northern Rugby Football League season
Rugby league county cups

References

External links
Saints Heritage Society
1896–97 Northern Rugby Football Union season at wigan.rlfans.com
Hull&Proud Fixtures & Results 1896/1897
Widnes Vikings - One team, one passion Season In Review - 1896-97
The Northern Union at warringtonwolves.org

RFL Yorkshire Cup
Yorkshire Cup